Aoteadrillia otagoensis is a species of sea snail, a marine gastropod mollusk in the family Horaiclavidae.

It was formerly included within the family Turridae.

Description

Distribution
This marine species is endemic to New Zealand and occurs off Ninety Mile Beach, North Island.

References

 Powell, Arthur William Baden. The New Zealand Recent and Fossil Mollusca of the Family Turridae: With General Notes on Turrid Nomenclature and Systematics. No. 2. Unity Press limited, printers, 1942.

External links
 Biolib: Aoteadrillia otagoensis
 Spencer H.G., Willan R.C., Marshall B.A. & Murray T.J. (2011). Checklist of the Recent Mollusca Recorded from the New Zealand Exclusive Economic Zone

otagoensis
Gastropods of New Zealand
Gastropods described in 1942